Ragna Breda (née Ragna Elisabeth Lindhjem, married name Ragna Bramer, October 12, 1905 – July 12, 1997) was a Norwegian actress as well as an author and translator of children's books.

Personal life
Ragna Breda was born in Horten, Norway. She married Trygve Gram Bramer (1908–2006) in 1933. She died in Fredrikstad, Norway.

Filmography
1931: Halvvägs till himlen (Swedish)
1933: Vi som går kjøkkenveien as Olga, Beck's servant girl
1936: Dyrk jorden! as Guri
1939: En enda natt (Swedish) as Mrs. Krogh (uncredited)
1940: Tante Pose as  Marianne
1944: Vigdis as Nordby's sister
1946: Et spøkelse forelsker seg

References

External links
 
 Ragna Breda at the Swedish Film Database
 Ragna Breda at Filmfront
 Ragna Breda at Sceneweb

1905 births
1997 deaths
20th-century Norwegian actresses
Norwegian women children's writers
20th-century Norwegian translators
People from Horten